This is a list of wars that began between 1500 and 1799. Other wars can be found in the historical lists of wars and the list of wars extended by diplomatic irregularity. Conflicts of this era include the Thirty Years' War in Europe, the Kongo Civil War in Africa, the Qing conquest of the Ming in Asia, the Spanish conquest of Peru in South America, and the American Revolutionary War in North America.

1500–1599

1600–1699

1700–1799

Notes

References

1500-1799
 
 
 
16th century-related lists
17th century-related lists
18th century-related lists